{{DISPLAYTITLE:C15H18O4}}
The molecular formula C15H18O4 may refer to:

 Artemisin, a sesquiterpene lactone
 Helenalin, a sesquiterpene lactone
 Parthenin, a sesquiterpene lactone
 Plicatin A, a hydroxycinnamic acid